is a former Japanese football player. He played for Japan national team.

Club career
Shigematsu was born in Hiroshima on April 2, 1930. When he played for Keio University, he won 1952 Emperor's Cup as a member of All Keio. After graduating from Keio University, he joined his local club Toyo Industries in 1954. He won the 2nd place at 1954 and 1957 Emperor's Cup. At 1954 Emperor's Cup, it was first Emperor's Cup finalist as a works team.

National team career
In May 1958, Shigematsu was selected Japan national team for 1958 Asian Games. At this competition, on May 28, he debuted against Hong Kong.

After retirement
After retirement, in 1974 Shigematsu became a president of his local baseball club Hiroshima Toyo Carp. In 1981, he moved to Fujita Industries (later Bellmare Hiratsuka) and became a president of the club in 1997. In 1999, he left the club.

National team statistics

References

External links
 
 Japan National Football Team Database

1930 births
Living people
Keio University alumni
Association football people from Hiroshima Prefecture
Japanese footballers
Japan international footballers
Sanfrecce Hiroshima players
Footballers at the 1958 Asian Games
Hibakusha
Association football forwards
Asian Games competitors for Japan